Zone-H is an archive of defaced websites. It was established in Estonia on March 2, 2002. A whois request on the domain shows that it was created on February 14, 2002.

Product 
Once a defaced website is submitted to Zone-H, it is mirrored on the Zone-H servers. The website is then moderated by the Zone-H staff to check if the defacement was fake. Sometimes, the hackers themselves submit their hacked pages to the site.

It is an Internet security portal containing original IT security news, digital warfare news, geopolitics, proprietary and general advisories, analyses, forums, researches. Zone-H is the largest web intrusions archive. It is published in several languages. Recently Zone-H was banned by some Indian ISPs due to legal prosecution  from the Indian government. Zone-H is popular in Iran and Turkey.

See also
WabiSabiLabi, online marketplace also created by Roberto Preatoni

References 

Hacking (computer security)
Estonian websites
Internet databases
Online archives
Aggregation websites
Internet censorship in India